Rhinocypha latimacula is a species of damselfly in the family Chlorocyphidae. It is endemic to the Philippines.  Its natural habitat is rivers. It is threatened by habitat loss.

Sources

Chlorocyphidae
Insects of the Philippines
Insects described in 1974
Taxonomy articles created by Polbot